The 2010 Congressional election in the Northern Mariana Islands occurred on November 2, 2010 and elected the territory's Delegate to the United States House of Representatives. Representatives and non-voting Delegates are elected for two-year terms; the elected will serve in the 112th Congress from January 3, 2011 until January 3, 2013.

These elections were held concurrently with the United States Senate elections of 2010, the United States House elections in other states and territories, and various territorial and local elections.

Background
Gregorio Sablan, the first delegate from the Northern Mariana Islands to the House of Representatives, ran for re-election. Sablan was challenged by Covenant Party candidate Joe Camacho, an attorney and former Floor Leader in the Northern Mariana Islands House of Representatives. The local Republican Party candidate was Juan N. Babauta, the former Governor of the Northern Mariana Islands. There was also one Democratic (CNMI) challenger, Jesus Borja, a former lieutenant governor.

The race was considered to be highly competitive given Sablan's vulnerability, having been elected by less than a quarter of the vote in 2008, the strong Republican political environment, and the number of strong challengers.

Candidates
Gregorio Sablan (I), incumbent Delegate
Joe Camacho (Cov), former Covenant Floor Leader in the Northern Mariana Islands House of Representatives
Jesus Borja (D), former Lieutenant Governor of the Northern Mariana Islands
Juan Babauta (R), former Resident Representative and former Governor of the Northern Mariana Islands

Results

References

2010 Northern Mariana Islands elections
Northern Mariana Islands
2010